Thomas Edwin Simmons (13 August 1929 – 1 October 2013) was an Australian rules footballer who played with Carlton in the Victorian Football League (VFL).

Notes

External links 

Tom Simmons's profile at Blueseum

1929 births
Carlton Football Club players
Australian rules footballers from Victoria (Australia)
2013 deaths